Alfred George Drake VC (10 December 1893 – 23 November 1915) was an English recipient of the Victoria Cross, the highest and most prestigious award for gallantry in the face of the enemy that can be awarded to British and Commonwealth forces.

Drake was born in December 1893 in Mile End, Stepney, London to Robert and Mary Ann Drake. He was 21 years old, and a corporal in the 8th Battalion, The Rifle Brigade (Prince Consort's Own), British Army during the First World War, and was awarded the VC for his actions on 23 November 1915, near La Brique, Belgium. He was killed in his VC action.

A striking mirrored memorial sculpture to Alfred George Drake has been installed at Ben Jonson Primary School, Stepney in his memory.

Citation
The London Gazette No. 29447, 21 January 1916

He was interred in La Brique No 2 Military cemetery near Ypres.

His VC is on display in the Lord Ashcroft Gallery at the Imperial War Museum, London.

The officer rescued by Corporal Drake was Lieutenant Henry Tryon, also of the Rifle Brigade. After Tryon recovered from his wounds, he returned to his former unit and was killed in action at Flers-Courcelette on 15 September 1916.

References

Monuments to Courage (David Harvey, 1999)
The Register of the Victoria Cross (This England, 1997)
VCs of the First World War: The Western Front 1915 (Peter F. Batchelor & Christopher Matson, 1999)

External links

1893 births
1915 deaths
British military personnel killed in World War I
British World War I recipients of the Victoria Cross
British Army personnel of World War I
Rifle Brigade soldiers
People from Stepney
British Army recipients of the Victoria Cross
Burials at La Brique Military Cemetery No. 2